Lithuania has submitted films for the Academy Award for Best International Feature Film since 2006 . The award is handed out annually by the United States Academy of Motion Picture Arts and Sciences to a feature-length motion picture produced outside the United States that contains primarily non-English dialogue. It was not created until the 1956 Academy Awards, in which a competitive Academy Award of Merit, known as the Best Foreign Language Film Award, was created for non-English speaking films, and has been given annually since.

Submissions
Below is a list of the films that have been submitted by Lithuania for review by the Academy for the award by year and the respective Academy Awards ceremony.

Though they have been invited to submit a film by AMPAS regularly since achieving independence in the early 1990s, Lithuania has only submitted films for Oscar consideration since 2006. In fall of that year, it was announced that they had submitted documentary short "Before Flying Back to Earth" in 2006. With a 52-minute running time, it is one of the few documentaries and few non-feature-length films ever to be submitted in the category. Before Flying Back to Earth follows the lives of a number of young cancer patients receiving treatment at Vilnius University Children's Hospital. Director Arūnas Matelis' own daughter had been a patient at this hospital several years before. The film won the Outstanding Directorial Achievement in Documentary award from the Directors Guild of America in 2007 and was featured at a number of international film festivals from 2005 to 2007, but failed to be nominated for an Oscar.

Two years later, they returned to the competition with Loss, a drama set in Lithuania and Ireland, focused on the theory of six degrees of separation. Having won two awards at the Shanghai International Film Festival, it was the first Lithuanian to feature at a Class A film festival. In 2009, they selected Vortex, a drama about a man's life spanning several decades before and after Lithuania's Soviet occupation.

Notes

References

Lithuania

Submissions